Vincenzo "the Tiger of Harlem" Terranova (May 15, 1886 – May 8, 1922) was a gangster and an early Italian-American organized crime figure in the United States. He succeeded Nicholas Morello as boss of the then Morello Gang in 1916 and was succeed by Giuseppe Masseria in 1922. He served as boss and underboss of the Morello crime family, today known as the Genovese crime family, the oldest of the Five Families in New York City.

Terranova was born in Corleone, Sicily in 1886. He was the first son of Bernardo Terranova, a member of the Mafia in Corleone, and his wife Angelina Piazza. Angelina had a son from a previous marriage, Giuseppe Morello, and would later give birth to Vincenzo's two brothers, Ciro Terranova and Nicolo Terranova. Vincenzo, Nicolo and Ciro along with other relatives emigrated to the United States, arriving in New York on March 8, 1893. Giuseppe Morello had immigrated to New York the previous year and sometime in the 1890s founded a gang known as the 107th Street Mob, which evolved into the Morello crime family. His three half brothers would eventually join him in this enterprise.

Death
On May 8, 1922, Vincenzo Terranova was gunned down in a drive-by shooting near his home on East 116th Street in Manhattan. Terranova's murder is generally attributed to Umberto Valenti, a notorious hitman for the D'Aquila crime family who was trying to seize control over the family.

Vincenzo and his three brothers lie in bare graves in Cavalary Cemetery in Queens, New York, not far from Joe Petrosino, who investigated them, and other Morello crime family members, such as Ignazio "Lupo the Wolf" Lupo.

References

 

1886 births
1922 deaths
1922 murders in the United States
Italian emigrants to the United States
Murdered American gangsters of Sicilian descent
Genovese crime family
Bosses of the Genovese crime family
People murdered in New York City
Male murder victims
Deaths by firearm in Manhattan
Prohibition-era gangsters